The 1988 Liège–Bastogne–Liège was the 74th edition of the Liège–Bastogne–Liège cycle race and was held on 17 April 1988. The race started and finished in Liège. The race was won by Adri van der Poel of the PDM team.

General classification

References

1988
1988 in Belgian sport